Afrosciadium articulatum, synonym Peucedanum articulatum, is a member of the carrot family, Apiaceae. It is native to northern Malawi.

References

Apioideae
Flora of Malawi